The following is a list, as yet incomplete, of Christian religious houses in Denmark whether extant or not, for both men and for women.

Denmark

Former Danish territories now in Germany

Southern Schleswig 

See also List of Christian monasteries in Schleswig-Holstein
For Rügen, see List of Christian monasteries in Mecklenburg-Vorpommern

Former Danish territories in Skåne and Halland, now in Sweden 

See also List of Christian monasteries in Sweden

Notes

Sources
 Garner, H. N., 1968: Atlas over danske klostre 
Digitalt atlas over klostre i middelalderens Danmark 
 MiddelalderInfo om danske klostre og kirker 

 
Denmark
Christian monasteries